The Lovely Bones is a 2002 novel by American writer Alice Sebold. It is the story of a teenage girl who, after being raped and murdered, watches from her personal Heaven as her family and friends struggle to move on with their lives while she comes to terms with her own death. The novel received critical praise and became an instant bestseller. A film adaptation, directed by Peter Jackson, who personally purchased the rights, was released in 2009. The novel was also later adapted as a play of the same name, which premiered in England in 2018.

Title
The novel's title is taken from a quotation at the story's conclusion, when Susie ponders her friends' and family's newfound strength after her death:

Plot
On December 6, 1973, 14-year-old Susie Salmon takes her usual shortcut home from her school through a cornfield in Norristown, Pennsylvania. George Harvey, her 36-year-old neighbor, a bachelor who builds doll houses for a living, persuades her to look at an underground kid's hideout he constructed in the field. Once she climbs into the hideout, he rapes and murders her, then dismembers her body and puts her remains in a safe that he dumps in a sinkhole, along with throwing her charm bracelet into a pond. Susie's spirit flees toward her personal Heaven, and in doing so, rushes past her classmate, social outcast Ruth Connors, who can see Susie's ghostly spirit.

The Salmon family initially refuses to believe that Susie is dead, until a neighbor's dog finds Susie's elbow. The police talk to Harvey, finding him odd but not suspicious. Susie's father, Jack, gradually suspects Harvey. Jack's surviving daughter, Lindsey, eventually shares this sentiment. Jack takes an extended leave from work. Meanwhile, another of Susie's classmates, Ray Singh, who had a crush on Susie in school, develops a friendship with Ruth, drawn together by their connection with Susie.

Later, Detective Len Fenerman tells the Salmons that the police have exhausted all leads and are dropping the investigation. That night, Jack peers out of his den window and sees a flashlight in the cornfield. Believing Harvey is returning to destroy evidence, Jack runs out to confront him, armed with a baseball bat. The figure is not Harvey, but Clarissa, Susie's best friend who is dating Brian, one of Susie's classmates. As Susie watches in horror from heaven, Brian—who was going to meet Clarissa in the cornfield—nearly beats Jack to death, and Clarissa breaks Jack's knee. While Jack recovers from knee replacement surgery, Susie's mother, Abigail, begins cheating on Jack with the widowed Det. Fenerman.

Trying to help her father prove his suspicions, Lindsey sneaks into Harvey's house and finds a diagram of the underground den, but is forced to leave when Harvey unexpectedly returns. The police do not arrest Lindsey for breaking and entering. Harvey flees from Norristown. Later, evidence is discovered that links Harvey to Susie's murder as well as those of several other girls. Meanwhile, Susie meets Harvey's other victims in heaven and sees into his traumatic childhood.

Abigail leaves Jack and eventually takes a job at a winery in California. Abigail's mother, Grandma Lynn, moves into the Salmons' home to care for Buckley (Susie's younger brother) and Lindsey. Eight years later, Lindsey and her boyfriend, Samuel Heckler, become engaged after finishing college, find an old house in the woods owned by a classmate's father, and decide to fix it up and live there. Sometime after the celebration, while arguing with his son Buckley, Jack suffers a heart attack. The emergency prompts Abigail to return from California, but the reunion is tempered by Buckley's lingering bitterness for her having abandoned the family for most of his childhood.

Meanwhile, Harvey returns to Norristown, which has become more developed. He explores his old neighborhood and notices the school is being expanded into the cornfield where he murdered Susie. He drives by the sinkhole where Susie's body rests and where Ruth and Ray are standing. Ruth senses the women Harvey has killed and is physically overcome. Susie, watching from heaven, is also overwhelmed with emotion and feels how she and Ruth transcend their present existence, and the two girls exchange positions: Susie, her spirit now in Ruth's body, connects with Ray, who senses Susie's presence and is stunned by the fact that Susie is briefly back with him. The two make love as Susie has longed to do after witnessing her sister and Samuel. Afterwards, Susie returns to Heaven.

Susie moves on to another, larger part of Heaven, but occasionally watches earthbound events. Lindsey and Samuel have a daughter together named Abigail Suzanne. While stalking a young woman in New Hampshire, Harvey is hit on the shoulder by an icicle and falls to his death down a snow-covered slope into the ravine below. At the end of the novel, a Norristown couple finds Susie's charm bracelet but don't realize its significance, and Susie closes the story by wishing the reader "a long and happy life".

Characters
Susie Salmon, a 14-year-old girl who is raped and murdered in the first chapter. She narrates the novel from Heaven, witnessing the events on earth and experiencing hopes and longings for the everyday things she can no longer do. 
Jack Salmon, her father, who works for an insurance agency in Chadds Ford, Pennsylvania. After Susie's death, he is consumed with guilt at having failed to save her.
Abigail Salmon, Susie's mother, whose growing family responsibilities have frustrated her youthful dreams. After her daughter's death, she leaves her husband and children to move to California. She returns years later.
Lindsey Salmon, Susie's younger sister by one year. She tries to help her father investigate Harvey.
Buckley Salmon, Susie's younger brother by 10 years. His unplanned birth forced Abigail to cancel her plans for a teaching career. He sometimes sees Susie while she watches him in her heaven.
Grandma Lynn, Abigail's mother, an eccentric alcoholic who comes to live with the Salmons when her son-in-law asks her to help Abigail cope with Susie's death. After Abigail leaves, Lynn helps raise her grandchildren.
George Harvey, the Salmons' neighbor. A serial killer of young girls who has gone uncaught, he murders Susie. The Salmons gradually suspect him, and he eventually leaves Norristown to escape the investigation. He continues killing as he moves across the country. Years later, he dies in an accident while stalking a potential victim. Throughout the novel, Susie refers to him as Mr. Harvey, the name she had addressed him by in life.
Ruth Connors, a classmate whom Susie's spirit touches as Susie leaves the earth. Ruth becomes fascinated with Susie, despite having barely known her during her life, and begins writing about seeing visions of the dead.
Ray Singh, a boy from India, the first and only boy to kiss Susie, who later becomes Ruth's friend. He is first suspected by the police of murdering Susie, but he later proves his alibi. He is the one Susie spends her short time on earth with that she is granted years after her death.
Ruana Singh, Ray's mother, with whom Abigail Salmon sometimes smokes cigarettes.
Samuel Heckler, Lindsey's boyfriend and later her husband.
Hal Heckler, Sam's older brother who runs a motorcycle repair shop.
Len Fenerman, the police detective in charge of investigating Susie's death. His wife commits suicide some time before the events of the novel take place, and he later has an affair with Abigail.
Clarissa, Susie's best friend, whom Susie explains that she admires, because Clarissa was always allowed to do things Susie was not, like wear platform shoes and smoke. 
Nate, Buckley's best friend, who screams for help when he's choking.
Brian Nelson, Clarissa's boyfriend. He sees Jack Salmon holding a bat with a distraught-looking Clarissa nearby. He assumes Clarissa is Jack's victim, and takes the bat, severely beating Jack.
Holly, Susie's best friend in heaven. While the text does not say so explicitly, it is implied she is Vietnamese American. She has no accent and took her name from Audrey Hepburn's character Holly Golightly in Breakfast at Tiffany's.
Franny, a woman who worked as a social worker before being shot. She becomes Susie and Holly's mentor in their Heaven.
Mr. Dewitt, the boys' soccer coach at school. Mr. Dewitt encourages Lindsey, a successful athlete, to try out for his team.
Mrs. Dewitt, Mr. Dewitt's wife, an English teacher at Susie's school. She teaches both Lindsey and Susie.
Holiday, Susie's dog.
Principal Caden, the principal of Susie and Lindsey's school.

Reception

Critics in the US were generally positive; many noted that the story had more promise than the idea of a brutally murdered teenage girl going to heaven, and following her family and friends as they get on with their lives would have suggested. "This is a high-wire act for a first novelist, and Alice Sebold maintains almost perfect balance", wrote Katherine Bouton in The New York Times Book Review.
 
Ali Smith of The Guardian wrote that The Lovely Bones  "is a determined reiteration of innocence, a teeth-gritted celebration of something not dismembered or shattered at all, but continuous: the notion of the American family unit, dysfunctional, yes, but pure and good nonetheless." The Observer'''s Philip Hensher considers that the novel was "very readable" but "ultimately it seems like a slick, overpoweringly saccharine and unfeeling exercise in sentiment and whimsy".

Hensher notes too that "It's a very God-free heaven, with no suggestion that anyone has been judged, or found wanting". However, Sebold has stated that the book is not intended to be religious, "but if people want to take things and interpret them, then I can't do anything about that. It is a book that has faith and hope and giant universal themes in it, but it's not meant to be, 'This is the way you should look at the afterlife'".

Film adaptation

Director Peter Jackson secured the book's film rights.  In a 2005 interview, he stated the reader has "an experience when you read the book that is unlike any other. I don't want the tone or the mood to be different or lost in the film."  In the same interview, regarding Susie's heaven, he said the movie version would endeavor to make it appear "somehow ethereal and emotional, but it can't be hokey". The film stars Saoirse Ronan as Susie Salmon, Mark Wahlberg as Jack Salmon, Stanley Tucci as George Harvey, Rachel Weisz as Abigail Salmon, Susan Sarandon as Susie's Grandmother Lynn, and Rose McIver as Lindsey Salmon.

The film opened to a limited release in three U.S. theaters on December 11, 2009, and received international and wide release on January 15, 2010. It was met with mixed reviews, but nonetheless garnered an Academy Award nomination for Best Supporting Actor (Tucci).

 Stage adaptation 

A stage adaptation of the novel, adapted by Bryony Lavery and directed by Melly Still, made its world premiere at the Royal & Derngate, Northampton on 1 September 2018 before touring to Everyman Theatre, Liverpool, Northern Stage, Birmingham Repertory Theatre and New Wolsey Theatre.

References

External links
A Dark First Novel Suddenly Soars to the Top in The New York Times''

2002 American novels
American bildungsromans
American fantasy novels adapted into films
American novels adapted into plays
Bram Stoker Award for Best First Novel winners
Ghost narrator
Ghost novels
Novels set in heaven
Novels about missing people
Novels about serial killers
Novels set in Philadelphia
Novels set in the 1970s
Novels about psychic powers
Novels about rape
Novels about spirit possession
Novels about the afterlife
Little, Brown and Company books
2002 debut novels